Studio D Recording, Inc. is a San Francisco Bay Area based recording, mixing, and mastering studio opened in 1984 in Sausalito. Studio D is most well known for its live room, equipped with a 20 foot ceiling and tunable acoustics. Studio D has been a major presence in the Bay Area's music scene since its inception, recording a number of multiplatinum and Grammy Award winning albums.

Artists having worked at Studio D include Soundgarden, Earth, Wind, & Fire, Faith No More, Aretha Franklin, Huey Lewis and the News, Eddie Money, Bruce Hornsby, Chris Isaak, Carlos Santana, Joe Satriani, Dick Dale, Bonnie Raitt, Third Eye Blind, Ringo Starr, and Maria Muldaur.

Studio D ownership includes principals Joel Jaffe and Jeff Shea.

Selected List of Albums Recorded at Studio D 

Some notable albums recorded and/or mixed at Studio D include:

 Aretha Franklin: Aretha  1986
 Huey Lewis & the News: Fore!  1986
 Bruce Hornsby and the Range: The Way It Is 1986
 Melvins: Gluey Porch Treatments 1986
 Earth, Wind, & Fire: Touch the World  1987
 Pebbles: Pebbles  1987
 Faith No More: Introduce Yourself  1987
 Huey Lewis & the News: Small World  1988
 Faith No More: The Real Thing  1989
 Margaret Becker: Immigrant's Daughter  1989
 Soundgarden: Badmotorfinger  1991
 Dick Dale: Tribal Thunder  1993
 Chris Isaac: Forever Blue  1995
 Huey Lewis & the News: Time Flies... The Best of Huey Lewis & the News  1996
 The Verve Pipe: Villains  1996
 The Call: The Best of the Call  1997
 Eddie Money: Wanna Go Back  2007

References

External links 
 Mix Online  Mix Magazine details some projects by Studio D
 Mix Online  Mix magazine comments on Studio D's place in the 80's
Studio D company website

Recording studios in California
Music of the San Francisco Bay Area
Companies based in Marin County, California
1984 establishments in California
Sausalito, California